Man in the Saddle is a 1951 American Western film directed by Andre DeToth starring Randolph Scott. The screenplay is based on the 1938 novel of the same name by Ernest Haycox.

Man in the Saddle was the first of the many lucrative collaborations between its star Randolph Scott and producer Harry Joe Brown.

The film's plot centers on a farmer (Scott) who turns to violence when a powerful and ruthless land baron (Knox) tries to take over his land. In the process he is caught between two women, the ambitious Laurie (Leslie) and the down-to-earth Nan (Drew). A high point in the film is a fierce fistfight between Scott and John Russell.

Cast
 Randolph Scott as Owen Merritt
 Joan Leslie as Laurie Bidwell Isham
 Ellen Drew as Nan Melotte
 Alexander Knox as Will Isham
 Richard Rober as Fay Dutcher
 John Russell as Hugh Clagg
 Alfonso Bedoya as Cultus Charley
 Guinn 'Big Boy' Williams as Bourke Prine
 Clem Bevans as Pay Lankershim
 Cameron Mitchell as George Vird
 Richard Crane as Juke Vird
 Frank Sully as Lee Repp
 Tennessee Ernie Ford as a Wrangler / Singer of the main title song (uncredited)

References

External links
 
 
 
 
 

1951 films
1951 Western (genre) films
American Western (genre) films
Films directed by Andre DeToth
Columbia Pictures films
1950s English-language films
1950s American films